Sahi (from the Arabic word صاحي meaning healthy) is a non profit school health programme in Ras al-Khaimah, United Arab Emirates initiated in 2011 in collaboration with Arabian Healthcare Group, and the pilot was implemented in September 2012. Its objectives, services and themes are to promote preventive health services, and improve and promote health and safety-related attributes and behaviors in schools. It will also provide health screenings, health reports, health education workshops, and individual and/or family counselling.

The programme is run by the Arabian Healthcare Group and headed by Francesca Rodgers, a therapist from the United Kingdom. The medical side of the programme is supported by staff from RAK Hospital.

References

External links
Khaleejtimes.com
Ameinfo.com
Arabian Healthcare to launch new initiative
SAHI School Health Programme | WCD
Arabian Healthcare launches 'SAHI - School Health Program' in Ras Al Khaimah - RSSPump
Flair.wittysparks.com
Official Website

2011 establishments in the United Arab Emirates
Medical and health organisations based in the United Arab Emirates
Organisations based in the Emirate of Ras Al Khaimah
Education in the Emirate of Ras Al Khaimah